The men's 50 metre rifle, prone was a shooting sports event held as part of the Shooting at the 1964 Summer Olympics programme. It was the tenth appearance of the event. The competition was held on 16 October 1964 at the shooting ranges in Tokyo. 73 shooters from 43 nations competed.

Results

References

Shooting at the 1964 Summer Olympics
Men's 050m prone 1964